Erna Lazarus (June 16, 1903 – February 19, 2006) was a screen and television writer from the 1930s through the 1960s.

Lazarus, born in Boston, Massachusetts, was one of the founding members of the Screen Writers Guild. On her death, Variety credited her as "one of the first female screenwriters working steadily in the studio system." She also had an influential role in the formation of the Interguild Federal Credit Union.

Lazarus died on February 19, 2006, in Woodland Hills, California, at the age of 102.

Selected filmography
 Hollywood or Bust (the last film featuring Jerry Lewis and Dean Martin) - sole story and screen play
 Flareup (starring Raquel Welch) - associate producer
 Meet Me After the Show (starring Betty Grable) - original story
 Moonlight in Hawaii
 Double Date
 Atlantic Flight
 Let's Go Steady
 The Girl of the Limberlost (1945)
 Slightly Scandalous (1946)

Selected radio writing
 Mayor of the Town

Selected TV writing
 Racket Squad
 Mr. and Mrs. North 
 Petticoat Junction
 Bewitched
 Hawaiian Eye
 Surfside Six

References

External links

1903 births
2006 deaths
American centenarians
American television writers
American women screenwriters
Women centenarians
20th-century American women writers
20th-century American screenwriters
21st-century American women